Anis Mohamed Jumaa Saltou (born 1 April 1992), known as Anis Saltou, is a Libyan professional footballer who plays as a forward.

References

External links
 Anis Saltou - YouTube
 
 

1992 births
Living people
Fath Union Sport players
Association football forwards
Libyan footballers
Libya international footballers
Libya A' international footballers
Libyan expatriate sportspeople in Tunisia
Libyan expatriate sportspeople in Morocco
Libyan expatriate sportspeople in Egypt
2014 African Nations Championship players
Expatriate footballers in Tunisia
Expatriate footballers in Morocco
Expatriate footballers in Egypt
Libyan expatriate footballers
Al Ittihad Alexandria Club players
Étoile Sportive du Sahel players
Al-Ahli SC (Tripoli) players
2022 African Nations Championship players